Nabam Tuki (born 7 July 1964) is an Indian politician and a former Chief Minister of Arunachal Pradesh. He held this position twice between 2011 and 2016. His first term spanned between November 2011 and January 2016, while the second term merely lasted for 3 days in the month of July 2016. He belongs to the Indian National Congress. Tuki represents Sagalee Assembly constituency in Papumpare district.

Early life
Tuki was born in a Nyishi family on 7 July 1964 in Ompuli, Sagalee sub-division, Papum Pare district. He is married and has two sons and five daughters.

Political career

Tuki served as state National Students' Union of India president (1983 to 1986) and was the Chairman of North East NSUI Coordination Committee (1984 to 1986). He was the General Secretary of All India NSUI (1986 to 1988) and Arunachal Pradesh Youth Congress President (1988 to 1995). He was first elected to the second legislative assembly in 1995 from Sagalee constituency and served as the deputy agriculture minister in the Gegong Apang ministry. He also served as transport and civil aviation minister in 1998. He was re-elected to the assembly in 1999 from the same constituency and became a cabinet minister with the environment and forest portfolio in the Mukut Mithi ministry. He was re-elected in the 2004 assembly election and 2009 assembly elections and served as the PWD and Urban Development minister under the Gegong Apang and Dorjee Khandu ministries.

He replaced Jarbom Gamlin as the Chief Minister of Arunachal Pradesh on 1 November 2011 and continued until January 2016. After a political crisis in 2016, the President's Rule was imposed ending his tenure as the chief minister. On 13 July 2016, the Supreme Court quashed the Arunachal Pradesh Governor J.P. Rajkhowa's order to advance the Assembly session from 14 January 2016 to 16 December 2015, which resulted in President's rule in Arunachal Pradesh. As a result, Tuki took charge as the Chief Minister of Arunachal Pradesh on 13 July 2016. Hours before the Arunachal Pradesh Assembly floor test, he resigned as the Chief Minister on 16 July 2016.

In June 2021, he was investigated by the Central Bureau of Investigation (CBI) for allegedly awarding contracts to his relatives without following procedures during his tenure as the Minister of Public Works Department and Urban Development in Arunachal Pradesh. In December 2021, a special court at Yupia accepted CBI's closure report of the investigation after the allegations of corruption against Tuki could not be proved.

In August 2022, the Indian National Congress appointed Tuki as the chairman of the North East Congress Coordination Committee.

References

|-

Indian National Congress politicians from Arunachal Pradesh
1964 births
Living people
People from Papum Pare district
Indian Roman Catholics
Chief Ministers of Arunachal Pradesh
Chief ministers from Indian National Congress
Leaders of the Opposition in Arunachal Pradesh
Arunachal Pradesh MLAs 2014–2019